Halushko may refer to :
 Illya Halushko, an acoustic guitar musician member of Ukrainian band Esthetic Education
 Mykola Halushko, Ukrainian politician

See also
 Halušky or galuska, a traditional variety of thick, soft noodles or dumplings cooked in the Eastern European cuisines
 Halushka
 Hlushko (Ukrainian: Глушко)
 Galushko